The Nickelodeon Kids' Choice Awards India is the Indian version of the American awards show set to recognize Indian Film, TV, Music and Sports.
An adaptation of the US version, the Indian edition is licensed and produced by Viacom 18 Media Pvt. Limited.

The event was first held in Mumbai on 14 November 2013.. The Host was Kapil Sharma. The next edition of the event was held on 22 March 2015. The host of the 2015 edition was Manish Paul. Jay Sean, created the KCA jingle which complimented core ideology of empowering kids and having whole lot of fun. The third edition was held on 1 January 2017. The hosts of this edition was Manish Paul and Nihar. The fourth edition was held on 1 January 2018. The hosts of this edition were Rithvik Dhanjani and Bharti Singh.

Categories

Films
Favourite Movie Actor (2013, 2015 and (2013, 2015 and 2016)
Favourite Song (2013, 2015 and 2016)
Favourite Dancing Star (2013 and 2016)

Sports
Favourite Icon Of The Year (2013)

Other
Favourite Child Entertainer (2013, 2015 and 2016)
Favourite Indian Cartoon Character (2015 and 2016)

List of nominees and winners

2015

2014

Reception
Nick KCA 2013 India saw great success receiving over 1 lac votes for 12 categories in its maiden year.

See also

 List of Asian television awards

External links
Nickelodeon Kids' Choice Awards India official website

References

Indian television awards
Indian film awards
Nickelodeon India
2013 establishments in India
Nickelodeon Kids' Choice Awards
Awards established in 2013